Daniela Alcívar Bellolio (pen name, Nela Martínez; born March 3, 1982) is an Ecuadorian author, editor, and literary critic.

Literary career
After finishing her studies, Alcívar Bellolio moved to Buenos Aires, Argentina, where she started a second career at the Fundación Universidad del Cine. She later started studying for her master's degree in literature at the University of Buenos Aires, which she abandoned in favor of studying for her doctorate. During her college years, she published criticisms of books and films on her blog, titled  (literally "disdain" or "scorn").

Her first two books were the short story collection  ("For this clear morning") and the book of essays  ("Lightning rods"), both published in 2016 and written during her stay in Buenos Aires. She lived in Argentina for 13 years. Upon returning to Ecuador, Alcívar Bellolio began to work as an editor for the independent newspaper Turbina.

In April 2018, she received an honorable mention in the La Linares Short Novel Award for her novel Siberia, sent to the contest under the pseudonym "Nela Martínez." The story focuses on an Ecuadorian migrant who must live with the grief provoked by abandoning her home country and the death of her child. In his decision, the judge said that:
 The book won the Joaquín Gallegos Lara National Fiction Prize in the novel category.

In 2019, the Spanish company  published a new edition of Siberia, in which Alcívar Bellolio included an additional section titled "One year later."

Works
 (2016), short stories
 (2016), essays
 (2018), novel
 (2022), novel

References

Living people
1982 births
People from Guayaquil
21st-century Ecuadorian women writers
Ecuadorian women essayists
Ecuadorian women novelists
Ecuadorian women short story writers